Amphigerontia intermedia is a species of Psocoptera from the Psocidae family that can be found in Finland, France, Germany, Hungary, Italy, Poland, Romania, Sweden, Switzerland, and the Netherlands. The species are either light black or brown coloured.

References

Psocidae
Insects described in 1891
Psocoptera of Europe